Witold Edward Zagórski (25 September 1930 – 30 June 2016) was a Polish professional basketball player and coach.

Playing career

Club career
During his club playing career, Zagórski was a player of the Polish teams Polonia Warszawa (1950–1960), and CWKS Legia Warszawa (1960–1961). He won two Polish League championships, in 1959 and 1961.

Polish national team
Zagórski was a member of the senior Polish national basketball team, in 49 games (1951–1956). With Poland, he played at EuroBasket 1955.

Coaching career

Clubs
Zagórski was chosen to be the head coach of the FIBA European Selection team on 7 occasions (1967, 1968, 1969, 1970, 1971, 1972, 1973).

National team
Zagórski was the head coach the senior Polish national basketball team, (1961–1975). With Poland, he finished in 5th place at the 1967 FIBA World Championship. He also won three medals at the EuroBasket: silver (1963) and bronze (1965 and 1967).

With Zagórski as the team's head coach, Poland's senior national team also played at three Summer Olympic Games (1964 Tokyo, 1968 Mexico City, and 1972 Munich).

Personal
Zagórski died on 30 June 2016, at the age of 85.

References

Sources

External links
FIBA Profile
POLISH COACHING LEGEND, ZAGORSKI, PASSES AWAY.

1930 births
2016 deaths
Basketball players at the 1968 Summer Olympics
Basketball players at the 1972 Summer Olympics
Polish basketball coaches
Polish men's basketball players
Shooting guards
Basketball players from Warsaw
Olympic basketball players of Poland